Allum Green is a hamlet southwest of Lyndhurst, Hampshire, England.

During the night of 5/6 September 1940 it was the scene of a Luftwaffe bombing raid, which resulted in the deaths of four British Army soldiers of the RAOC (Royal Army Ordnance Corps) and 14 men were injured.

The precise location of bomb strike was on Allum Green House itself, which still exists and is a private home. The site is commemorated by a memorial bench erected in 1980 by comrades of the deceased.

Those killed were:
Warrant Officer Class 2 H S Tyler
Staff Sergeant S H Avon, 
Staff Sergeant E W E Gifford
Sergeant A W Blunn.

It was mentioned in R. C. Sherriff's Journey's End, as Raleigh lived there. Vera Brittain bought Allum Green Cottage in May 1939.

See also
Commonwealth War Graves Commission.

References 

Hamlets in Hampshire
New Forest